(E)-Stilbene, commonly known as trans-stilbene, is an organic compound represented by the condensed structural formula CHCH=CHCH.  Classified as a diarylethene, it features a central ethylene moiety with one phenyl group substituent on each end of the carbon–carbon double bond. It has an (E) stereochemistry, meaning that the phenyl groups are located on opposite sides of the double bond, the opposite of its geometric isomer, cis-stilbene. Trans-stilbene occurs as a white crystalline solid at room temperature and is highly soluble in organic solvents. It can be converted to cis-stilbene photochemically, and further reacted to produce phenanthrene.

Stilbene was discovered in 1843 by the French chemist Auguste Laurent.  The name "stilbene" is derived from the Greek word στίλβω (stilbo), which means "I shine", on account of the lustrous appearance of the compound.

Isomers

Stilbene exists as two possible stereoisomers. One is trans-1,2-diphenylethylene, called (E)-stilbene or trans-stilbene. The second is cis-1,2-diphenylethylene, called (Z)-stilbene or cis-stilbene, and is sterically hindered and less stable because the steric interactions force the aromatic rings out-of-plane and prevent conjugation.

Preparation and reactions
Many syntheses have been developed.  One popular route entails reduction of benzoin using zinc amalgam.

CH–CH(OH)–C(=O)–CH   ->[\ce{Zn(Hg)}][\ce{HCl} \text{, } \ce{CH3CH2OH}]   trans-CH–CH=CH–CH

Richard F. Heck and Tsutomu Mizoroki independently reported the synthesis of trans-stilbene by coupling of iodobenzene and styrene using a palladium(II) catalyst, in what is now known as the Mizoroki-Heck reaction. The Mizoroki approach produced the higher yield.

Stilbene undergoes reactions typical of alkenes. Trans-stilbene undergoes epoxidation with peroxymonophosphoric acid, HPO, producing a 74% yield of trans-stilbene oxide in dioxane.  The epoxide product formed is a racemic mixture of the two enantiomers of 1,2-diphenyloxirane. The achiral meso compound (1R,2S)-1,2-diphenyloxirane arises from cis-stilbene, though peroxide epoxidations of the cis-isomer produce both cis- and trans-epoxide products. For example, using tert-butyl hydroperoxide, oxidation of cis-stilbene produces 0.8% cis-stilbene oxide, 13.5% trans-stilbene oxide, and 6.1% benzaldehyde.  Enantiopure stilbene oxide has been prepared by Nobel laureate Karl Barry Sharpless.

Stilbene can be cleanly oxidised to benzaldehyde by ozonolysis or Lemieux–Johnson oxidation, and stronger oxidants such as acidified potassium permanganate will produce benzoic acid.  Vicinal diols can be produced via the Upjohn dihydroxylation or enantioselectively using Sharpless asymmetric dihydroxylation with enantiomeric excesses as high as 100%.

Bromination of trans-stilbene produces predominantly meso-1,2-dibromo-1,2-diphenylethane (sometimes called meso-stilbene dibromide), in line with a mechanism involving a cyclic bromonium ion intermediate of a typical electrophilic bromine addition reaction; cis-stilbene yields a racemic mixture of the two enantiomers of 1,2-dibromo-1,2-diphenylethane in a non-polar solvent such as carbon tetrachloride, but the extent of production of the meso compound increases with solvent polarity, with a yield of 90% in nitromethane.  The formation of small quantities of the two enantiomers of stilbene dibromide from the trans-isomer suggests that the bromonium ion intermediate exists in chemical equilibrium with a carbocation intermediate PhCHBr–C(H)Ph with a vacant p orbital vulnerable to nucleophilic attack from either face. The addition of bromide or tribromide salts restores much of the stereospecificity even in solvents with a dielectric constant above 35.

Upon UV irradiation it converts to cis-stilbene, a classic example of a photochemical reaction involving trans-cis isomerization, and can undergo further reaction to form phenanthrene.

Derivatives and uses

Synthetic
(E)-Stilbene itself is of little value, but it is a precursor to other derivatives used as dyes, optical brighteners, phosphors, and scintillators. Stilbene is one of the gain mediums used in dye lasers.

Disodium 4,4'-dinitrostilbene-2,2'-disulfonate is prepared by the sulfonation  of 4-nitrotoluene to form 4-nitrotoluene-2-sulfonic acid, which can then be oxidatively coupled using sodium hypochlorite to form the (E)-stilbene derivative in a process originally developed by Arthur George Green and André Wahl in the late nineteenth century. Improvements to the process with higher yields have been developed, using air oxidation in liquid ammonia. The product is useful as its reaction with aniline derivatives results in the formation of azo dyes. Commercially important dyes derived from this compound include Direct Red 76, Direct Brown 78, and Direct Orange 40.

Natural stilbenes
The stilbenoids are naturally occurring stilbene derivatives. Examples include resveratrol and its cousin, pterostilbene. The stilbestrols, which are structurally but not synthetically related to (E)-stilbene, exhibit estrogenic activity. bMembers of this group include diethylstilbestrol, fosfestrol, and dienestrol. Some such derivative are produced by condensation of coenzyme A derivatives of cinnamic acid or 4-hydroxycinnamic acid and the malonic acid.

Appendix
Table 1. Vapor pressures

References

External links
 (E)-Stilbene on ChemExper

Luminescence
Fluorescent dyes
Phosphors and scintillators
Laser gain media
Stilbenoids
Phenyl compounds